Billy, Willie or William Forbes may refer to:

Financiers
Sir William Forbes, 6th Baronet (1739–1806), Scottish banker
William Forbes of Callendar (1756–1823), Scottish coppersmith and landowner
William Howell Forbes (1837–1896), American businessman in Hong Kong
William Hathaway Forbes (1840–1897), American investor in company owned by Alexander Graham Bell

Footballers
Billy Forbes (Scottish footballer) (before 1895–after 1928), right back who also played in Massachusetts
Willie Forbes (1922–1999), Scottish wing half
Billy Forbes (footballer, born 1990), Turks and Caicos Islands striker

Public officials
William Forbes (Lower Canada politician) (1787–1814), merchant and legislator
William Forbes (MP) (1806–1855), Scottish MP for Stirlingshire
William Henry Forbes (1815–1875), American fur trader and territorial legislator
William Cameron Forbes (1870–1959), American diplomat and investment banker
William Forbes (Talamancan king), King of Talamanca, Costa Rica between 1872–1880.

Scholars
William Forbes (bishop) (1585–1634), Scottish churchman, first Bishop of Edinburgh
William S. Forbes (1831–1905), American physician
William Alexander Forbes (1855–1883), English zoologist
William Trowbridge Merrifield Forbes (1885–1968), American entomologist

Others
William Nairn Forbes (1796–1855), British military engineer
William Forbes (railway manager) (1856–1936), British railway manager
William E. Forbes (1906–1999), member of the University of California Board of Regents

See also
William Forbes Mackenzie (1807–1862), Scottish Conservative politician
William Forbes Skene (1809–1892), Scottish historian and antiquary
William Forbes Gatacre (1843–1906), British general
William Forbes-Sempill, 19th Lord Sempill (1893–1965), British engineer